The Mikhail Frunze is a Valerian Kuybyshev-class (92-016, OL400) Soviet/Russian river cruise ship, cruising in the Volga – Kama – Neva basin. The ship was built by Slovenské Lodenice at their shipyard in Komárno, Czechoslovakia, and entered service in 1980. At 4,050 tonnes, Mikhail Frunze is one of the biggest river cruise ships currently in service with Vodohod. Her sister ships are Valerian Kuybyshev, Fyodor Shalyapin, Feliks Dzerzhinskiy, Sergey Kuchkin, Mstislav Rostropovich, Aleksandr Suvorov, Semyon Budyonnyy and Georgiy Zhukov. Her home port is currently Nizhny Novgorod.

Features
The ship has two restaurants, two bars, solarium, sauna and resting area.

See also
 List of river cruise ships

References

External links

Расписание и стоимость круизов теплохода Михаил Фрунзе (проект 92-016) 
Project 92-016 
Ship listing of the project 92-016

1980 ships
River cruise ships